The Clarence and Ethel Boyer House, located in Eugene, Oregon, is listed on the National Register of Historic Places.

See also
 National Register of Historic Places listings in Lane County, Oregon

References

1927 establishments in Oregon
Colonial Revival architecture in Oregon
Houses completed in 1927
Houses on the National Register of Historic Places in Eugene, Oregon